The Blair Bridge or Abraham Lincoln Memorial Bridge carries U.S. Route 30 between the U.S. states of Nebraska and Iowa, across the Missouri River near Blair, Nebraska. Rail traffic crosses via the parallel Blair Bridge (Union Pacific Railroad).

History
The first Blair Bridge opened to traffic in 1929. It was designed by Harrington, Howard, and Ash and Sverdrup & Parcel and constructed by Kansas City Bridge Company, Wisconsin Bridge & Iron Company, and Woods Brothers Construction Company. Originally a toll bridge, the tolls were removed in 1962.

In 1991, a new structure replaced the original truss bridge.

See also
The Lincoln Highway formerly ran through Blair and over this bridge
List of bridges documented by the Historic American Engineering Record in Iowa
List of bridges documented by the Historic American Engineering Record in Nebraska

Reference

External links

U.S. Route 30
Road bridges in Nebraska
Road bridges in Iowa
Bridges over the Missouri River
Bridges of the United States Numbered Highway System
Buildings and structures in Washington County, Nebraska
Historic American Engineering Record in Nebraska
Historic American Engineering Record in Iowa
Interstate vehicle bridges in the United States